Haskin may refer to:

Haskin (crater),  lunar impact crater
Haskin (surname)
Haskin Smith (fl. 1872–1876), American politician

See also
Haskins (disambiguation)